Anna "Annie" Maria van der Vegt (4 December 1903 – 13 April 1983) was a Dutch gymnast who competed in the 1928 Summer Olympics.

In 1928 she won the gold medal as member of the Dutch gymnastics team.

She was born in The Hague and died in Rijswijk.

References
 profile

1903 births
1983 deaths
Dutch female artistic gymnasts
Olympic gymnasts of the Netherlands
Gymnasts at the 1928 Summer Olympics
Olympic gold medalists for the Netherlands
Gymnasts from The Hague
Olympic medalists in gymnastics
Medalists at the 1928 Summer Olympics
20th-century Dutch women